Noelia may refer to:

 Noelia, a Puerto Rican pop singer
 Noelia (album) (1999), her self-titled album
 Noelia Artigas (born 1989), a handball player from Uruguay
 Noelia Barbeito (born 1981), an Argentinian politician and provincial senator
 Noelia Bermudez (born 1994), a Costa Rican footballer
 Noelia Fernandez (born 1978), a former road cyclist from Argentina
 Noelia Gil (born 1994), a Spanish football goalkeeper
 Noelia López (born 1986), a Spanish model
 Noelia López (footballer) (born 1978), an Argentinian footballer
 Noelia García Martin (born 1973), a Spanish swimmer who competed in the 2004 Paralympics
 Noelia Marzol (born 1986), an Argentinian actress and businesswoman
 Noelia Oncina (born 1976), a Spanish handball player who competed in the 2004 Olympics
 Noelia Reyes (born 1991), a member of the Puerto Rico women's national football team
 Noelia Sala (born 1988), an Argentinian handball player
 Noelia Zeballos (born 1994), a Bolivian tennis player

See also
Noelle (disambiguation)

Spanish feminine given names